Hujjat al-Islam Seyyed Mohammad Vaez Mousavi (was born 1964 in Shabestar, East Azerbaijan)  is an Iranian Shiite cleric and politician. He is a member of the 4th Assembly of Experts from electorate East Azerbaijan. Va'ez Mousavi won with 305,072 votes

See also 

 List of members in the Fourth Term of the Council of Experts

References

People from Shabestar
Members of the Assembly of Experts
Living people
1964 births